Mikell may refer to:


People

Surname
George Mikell (born 1929), Lithuanian-Australian actor
Henry J. Mikell (1866-1942), American clergyman
Quintin Mikell (born 1980), American football player
Troy Lee Mikell (born 1960s), American basketball player
William Ephraim Mikell (1868–1944), American legal scholar, lawyer and dean of the University of Pennsylvania Law School

Given name
Mikell Simpson (born 1985), American football player

Places
Mikell's, a jazz club in New York City, U.S.
Isaac Jenkins Mikell House, a historic house in Charleston, South Carolina, U.S.